The 1960 VFL Night Premiership Cup was the Victorian Football League end of season cup competition played in September of the 1960 VFL Premiership Season. This was the fifth season of the VFL Night Series. Run as a knock-out tournament, it was contested by the eight VFL teams that failed to make the 1960 VFL finals series. Games were played at the Lake Oval, Albert Park, then the home ground of South Melbourne, as it was the only ground equipped to host night games. South Melbourne went on to win the night series cup for the third time, defeating Hawthorn in the final by 13 points.

Games

Round 1

|- bgcolor="#CCCCFF"
| Winning team
| Winning team score
| Losing team
| Losing team score
| Ground
| Crowd
| Date
|- bgcolor="#FFFFFF"
| 
| 7.13 (55)
| 
| 7.10 (52)
| Lake Oval
| 15,800
| Thursday, 1 September
|- bgcolor="#FFFFFF"
| 
| 7.9 (51)
| 
| 6.10 (46)
| Lake Oval
| 10,600
| Tuesday, 6 September
|- bgcolor="#FFFFFF"
| 
| 8.11 (59)
| 
| 6.5 (41)
| Lake Oval
| 5,600
| Thursday, 8 September
|- bgcolor="#FFFFFF"
| 
| 17.21 (123)
| 
| 9.7 (61)
| Lake Oval
| 9,800
| Tuesday, 13 September

Semifinals

|- bgcolor="#CCCCFF"
| Winning team
| Winning team score
| Losing team
| Losing team score
| Ground
| Crowd
| Date
|- bgcolor="#FFFFFF"
| 
| 11.14 (80)
| 
| 6.15 (51)
| Lake Oval
| 16,800
| Thursday, 15 September
|- bgcolor="#FFFFFF"
| 
| 14.20 (104)
| 
| 6.8 (44)
| Lake Oval
| 14,500
| Tuesday, 20 September

Final

|- bgcolor="#CCCCFF"
| Winning team
| Winning team score
| Losing team
| Losing team score
| Ground
| Crowd
| Date
|- bgcolor="#FFFFFF"
| 
| 10.12 (72)
| 
| 8.11 (59)
| Lake Oval
| 20,000
| Tuesday, 27 September

See also

List of Australian Football League night premiers
1960 VFL season

External links
 1960 VFL Night Premiership - detailed review including quarter-by-quarter scores, best players and goalkickers for each match

Australian Football League pre-season competition